Dante Franzil (27 December 1910 – 23 August 1981) was an Italian racing cyclist. He rode in the 1934 Tour de France.

References

1910 births
1981 deaths
Italian male cyclists
Place of birth missing